George Davidson of Pettens (c. 1593–1663) was a 17th-century Scottish landowner, merchant and philanthropist.

Life
Little is known of his early life but he is thought to be descended from the Davidsons of Cairnbrogie. He was a burgess in Aberdeen from 1650.

He owned the Pettens estate near Balmedie, north of Aberdeen.

He appears to have been a rich merchant in Aberdeen. Having no wife or family he spent much of his money on the city. His works included:

A new bridge on the River Don in Old Aberdeen.
Rebuilding the bridge at Insch
Rebuilding the churchyard walls at St Clements Church in the Footdee district
Chapel of Ease in the Newhills district
A fund to aid the ministers of St Clements and St Nicholas

He died in Aberdeen in 1663 and is buried in the churchyard of the Kirk of St Nicholas.

Memorials

A stone memorial to him is placed within St Clements Church in Aberdeen.

References

1590s births
1663 deaths
People from Aberdeenshire
Scottish philanthropists
Year of birth uncertain